Keith Floyd (1943–2009) was an English broadcaster, restaurateur and food writer. He was brought up in Somerset, England, where his mother taught him to cook. He was educated at Wellington, a local public school, although he left at the age of sixteen. He joined the Bristol Evening Post as a cub reporter—where he worked alongside the future playwright Tom Stoppard. He was commissioned into the Royal Tank Regiment in 1963 as a second lieutenant, but his career there only lasted until 1966; he left military service and moved to London and then France, where he worked in several restaurants in various roles.

In 1971 he set up his first restaurant in Bristol—Floyd's Bistro—which proved popular enough for him to open three further outlets in the city. His burgeoning empire soon collapsed and he sailed around the Mediterranean for two years, from where he exported wine to the UK. He also opened a restaurant in the south of France, but this was also unsuccessful and it closed in 1979, when Floyd returned to the UK. He opened another Bristol-based restaurant and wrote a book—Floyd's Food—which was locally published in 1981; this led to a short recipe slot on the local Radio West station. In 1983 one of his customers—David Pritchard, a television producer—suggested to Floyd that he front a television series, which resulted in Floyd on Fish, broadcast on BBC Two in late 1985. Several series followed on the BBC before the Floyd-Pritchard partnership broke up in 1993; a corresponding book appeared with each series. There were no scripts for the programmes, and Floyd ad-libbed throughout; when he ran out of words, he would sip from an ever-present glass of wine to give him time to create the next line. Pritchard's directing style and Floyd's presentation technique produced what the food writer Tom Jaine considers as "cheerful mayhem", although viewers were educated in basic techniques. He went on to say that "Floyd's performances, on or near the stove, were a refreshing departure from the prissy, controlled style then in favour at the BBC, or the alternative mode of half an hour with a French chef whose incomprehensible English made the recipes a mystery."

Paul Levy, Floyd's obituarist, considered the broadcaster had "no outstanding talent, either as a cook or as a TV presenter, no great knowledge of his subject, or any apparent passion for anything but drink. This is not to say that his first TV programmes were bad – they were, indeed, highly diverting entertainment". The programmes were also highly popular both with the public and other cooks. Following his death of heart disease in September 2009 several fellow chefs voiced their opinions of him. Hugh Fearnley-Whittingstall considers that Floyd "cooked his ingredients with the love and passion of a gifted amateur", while Heston Blumenthal opines that "His enthusiasm, even when he was being a bit crotchety, jumped out of the screen. No-one made TV food programmes quite like him. He had a wealth of knowledge but there was a no-nonsense approach to it all".

Bibliography

Food and drink writing

Other published works

Television

Radio

Stage
Floyd had a one-man show, Floyd Uncorked: The Life of a Bon Viveur. The show, which was unscripted, toured the British provinces in 2006 and 2007.

Notes and references

Notes

References

Sources

 
 

Bibliographies by writer
Bibliographies of British writers